Pavan Rathnayake (born 24 August 2002) is a Sri Lankan cricketer. He made his first-class debut for Sri Lanka Police Sports Club in Tier B of the 2018–19 Premier League Tournament on 17 April 2019. He made his Twenty20 debut on 10 March 2021, for Colombo Cricket Club in the 2020–21 SLC Twenty20 Tournament. In August 2021, he was named in the SLC Blues team for the 2021 SLC Invitational T20 League tournament.

References

External links
 

2002 births
Living people
Sri Lankan cricketers
Colombo Cricket Club cricketers
Sri Lanka Police Sports Club cricketers
Place of birth missing (living people)